The Canadian Journal of Information and Library Science is a quarterly peer-reviewed academic journal covering research findings related to library systems and services. It is published by the University of Toronto Press on behalf of the Canadian Association for Information Science. It was established in 1976 as the Canadian Journal of Information Science, obtaining its current title in 1993.

Abstracting and indexing
The journal is abstracted and indexed in Current Contents/Social and Behavioral Sciences, ERIC, Information Science & Technology Abstracts, Library and Information Science Abstracts, Social Sciences Citation Index, and Scopus. According to the Journal Citation Reports, the journal has a 2014 impact factor of 0.111, ranking it 82nd out of 85 journals in the category "Information Science & Library Science."

References

External links

University of Toronto Press academic journals
Information science journals
University of Toronto
Quarterly journals
Publications established in 1976
English-language journals
Academic journals associated with learned and professional societies of Canada